The 2006 East–West Shrine Game was the 81st staging of the all-star college football exhibition game featuring NCAA Division I Football Bowl Subdivision players. The game featured over 80 players from the 2005 college football season, and prospects for the 2006 Draft of the professional National Football League (NFL). In the week prior to the game, scouts from all 32 NFL teams attended. The proceeds from the East–West Shrine Game benefit Shriners Hospitals for Children. For sponsorship purposes, the game was officially the East–West Shrine Game presented by AT&T.

The game was played on January 21, 2006, at 3 p.m. CT at the Alamodome in San Antonio, and was televised by ESPN2. Other than the 1942 game, which was played in New Orleans, this was the first time that the Shrine Game was played outside of California.

The offensive MVP was Reggie McNeal (QB, Texas A&M), while the defensive MVP was James Wyche (DE, Syracuse). The Pat Tillman Award was presented to Charlie Peprah (S, Alabama); the award "is presented to a player who best exemplifies character, intelligence, sportsmanship and service".

Scoring summary 

Sources:

Statistics 

Source:

Coaching staff 
East head coach: Houston Nutt

East assistants: Reggie Herring & Mike Markuson

West head coach: Dennis Franchione

West assistants: Brad Franchione & Les Koenning

Source:

Rosters 
Source:

2006 NFL Draft

References

Further reading 
 
 
 
 

East-West Shrine Game
East–West Shrine Bowl
American football competitions in San Antonio
January 2006 sports events in the United States
East-West Shrine Game
21st century in San Antonio